Kensington is a baseball club playing in the South Australian Baseball League. Known as the Cardinals, their home ground is Newland Reserve in Erindale.
                                                       
Won the Division 1 Premiership 2009/2010, 2010/2011 and 2011/2012.

History 

As at the end of the 2006/07 season, a total of 351 players have represented 'A' grade for the club.

 1 – P.A. Ohlstrom (1926)
 50 – N.T. Todd (1935)
 100 – L.E. Favell (1952)
 150 – Ian Smith (1968)
 200 – W. Fryar (1978/79)
 250 – D. Ebel (1990/91)
 300 – A. Chenoweth (2000/01)
 350 – J. Nealie (2006/07)

Notable players
 Ben Wigmore – catcher for the St. Louis Cardinals, silver medalist with Australia at 2004 Athens Olympics.

External links
Kensington Baseball Club

References 

Australian baseball clubs
Sporting clubs in Adelaide